is the third handheld installment in the Monster Hunter franchise, developed by Capcom for the PlayStation Portable. Like its predecessor, Monster Hunter Freedom 2, Portable 3rd is an original title that adapts the core content of Monster Hunter Tri into a new single player campaign, adding supplemental original content. The game introduces regions, monsters, and a revised Felyne combat system.

A high definition remaster, the first of Sony's "PSP Remasters" series for the PlayStation 3, was released in Japan on August 25, 2011. The remaster's features include enhanced HD graphics, 3D support and shared save support with the PSP.

Gameplay

Reception
Famitsu gave the PSP version a score of two tens, one nine, and one ten, for an almost-perfect score of 39 out of 40.

Sales
The game was number one in the Japanese sales chart of 5 December 2010, replacing Gran Turismo 5. Within two weeks of release by December 20, Monster Hunter Portable 3rd sold 2.58 million units in Japan. According to the game's publisher, Monster Hunter Portable 3rd is "now the fastest selling PSP title ever in Japan" and "the fastest selling game in Capcom's history." By June 2011, the game's sales in Japan had reached 4.8 million units; making it the third best-selling PSP game of all time.

Notes

References

External links
Official site (Japanese)

Role-playing video games
Action role-playing video games
Monster Hunter
PlayStation Portable games
PlayStation 3 games
Video games developed in Japan
Video games featuring protagonists of selectable gender
Video games with stereoscopic 3D graphics
2010 video games
Japan Game Awards' Game of the Year winners